Orzech may refer to:

 Orzech (surname), a family name
 Orzech, Silesian Voivodeship, Poland

See also